Kulenović or Kulenovic is a surname. Notable people with the surname include:

 Almin Kulenović (born 1973), Bosnian footballer
 Džafer-beg Kulenović (1891–1956), Vice President of the Independent State of Croatia during World War II
 Faruk Kulenović (born 1952), Croatian-Bosnian basketball coach
 Goran Kulenović (born 1971), Croatian film director and screenwriter
 Katarina Matanović-Kulenović (1913–2003), the first female Croatian pilot and parachutist
 Maya Kulenovic (born 1975), Canadian artist and painter
 Mehmed-beg Kulenović (1776–1806), Ottoman soldier
 Nahid Kulenović (1929–1969), Croatian columnist
 Osman Kulenović (1889–1947), Croatian politician
 Rizha Kulenovic, curator of The Kulenovic Collection
 Sandro Kulenović (born 1999), Croatian footballer
 Skender Kulenović (1910–1978), Bosniak poet, novelist and dramatist
 Vuk Kulenovic (born 1946), contemporary composer, living in Boston

Bosnian surnames